"Rodeo" is a single by American rapper Juvenile taken from his seventh solo studio album Reality Check. It was released in 2006 via Atlantic Records. Produced by Cool & Dre, the song samples the remix of R. Kelly's "Bump n' Grind".

It peaked at number 41 on the Billboard Hot 100 in the United States.

The song was later sampled by Kodak Black ("Rodeo"), Kent Jones ("Don't Mind"), and Megan Thee Stallion ("Work That").

Personnel
Terius "Juvenile" Gray – rap vocals, songwriter
Marcello "Cool" Valenzano – producer, songwriter
Andre "Dre" Lyon – producer, songwriter
Robert Kelly – songwriter
Manny Marroquin – mixing

Charts

Weekly charts

Year-end charts

Certifications

External links

References

2006 songs
2006 singles
Juvenile (rapper) songs
Atlantic Records singles
Songs written by R. Kelly
Songs written by Juvenile (rapper)
Songs written by Cool (record producer)
Music videos directed by Marc Klasfeld
Song recordings produced by Cool & Dre
Songs written by Dre (record producer)